Malcolm Boyd (June 8, 1923 – February 27, 2015) was an American Episcopal priest and author. He was active in the Civil Rights Movement as one of the Freedom Riders in 1961 and as a minister. Boyd was also active in the anti-Vietnam War movement. In 1977 Boyd "came out", revealing that he was homosexual and becoming a spokesman for gay rights.

In 1965, Boyd published a book of prayers, Are You Running with Me, Jesus?, which became a bestseller. In 2005 it was published in a 40th-anniversary edition. In 2013 he served as a poet/writer in residence at St. Paul Cathedral in Los Angeles.

Early life 
Boyd was born in 1923 in Buffalo, New York, the son of Beatrice Lowrie, a fashion model, and Melville Boyd, a financier and investment banker whose own father (also named Malcolm) was an Episcopal priest. Boyd was raised as an Episcopalian (his maternal grandfather was Jewish).

In the early 1930s Boyd's parents divorced; his mother retained custody of him. Boyd moved with his mother to Colorado Springs, Colorado, and then to Denver. During his time in college, despite early spiritual interests, he decided he was an atheist. In the 1940s Boyd moved to Hollywood and rented a room in $15.00 a week boarding house on Franklin Avenue. He owned few possessions and only one shirt, but was eventually given a position at a large agency and became a Hollywood junior producer. He began moving up in the Hollywood world, eventually founding PRB, a production company, with Mary Pickford, becoming her business partner. At the same time, amidst all the abundance and glamour of Hollywood, he found himself looking for meaning in different places, including churches.

Priesthood 
In 1951 Boyd began studying to become a priest at the Church Divinity School of the Pacific in Berkeley, California. He graduated in 1954 and was ordained a deacon. In 1955 he continued his studies abroad in England and Switzerland and returned to Los Angeles for ordination as a priest. During 1956 and 1957, Boyd studied further at Union Theological Seminary in the City of New York and wrote his first book, Crisis in Communication. In 1959 Boyd became Episcopal Chaplain at Colorado State University. In the 1960s Boyd became known as "the Espresso Priest" for his religiously themed poetry-reading sessions at the Hungry i nightclub in San Francisco, at the time of the San Francisco Renaissance poetry movement. Boyd recalled in an interview with The Lavender effect that the San Francisco Chronicle once called him "Marlon Brando in a collar," due to his Hollywood connections and attractive appearance.

Activism 
Boyd went on to become a minister in the American Civil Rights Movement, promoting integration and voting rights. He participated as one of the Freedom Riders in 1961. Later that year he became the Episcopal Chaplain at Wayne State University in Detroit. He held a weekly meeting about civil rights, influencing Viola Liuzzo. Three years later she went to Selma, Alabama, to participate in the voting rights marches organized by SCLC and SNCC. She was murdered by the Klan while transporting marchers from Montgomery back to Selma following the successful march ending on March 25.

In 1963 Boyd attended an interfaith conference for racial integration in Chicago. Malcolm X referred to Boyd at the conference in his 1963 speech, "The Old Negro and the New Negro." Malcolm X said, "Rev. Boyd believes that the conference might have accomplished much good if the speakers had included a white supremacist and a Negro race leader, preferably a top man in the American Black Muslim movement." He quotes Boyd:

Boyd was also active in the anti-Vietnam War movement, leading demonstrations and teach-ins in protest of U.S. involvement in the Vietnam War. In 1970, Boyd was among 17 antiwar protesters, which also included Daniel Berrigan, who were arrested for attempting to celebrate a "mass for peace" at The Pentagon.

Later life and works 
In 1977 Boyd came out of the closet, becoming one of the first prominent American clergymen to publicly acknowledge his homosexuality. In the 1980s Boyd met Mark Thompson, an author, journalist and activist. Boyd and Thompson were domestic partners for almost 30 years and were married in 2013. Boyd considered his partnership and marriage to Thompson to be one of the most fulfilling aspects of his life. They resided in the Silver Lake neighborhood of Los Angeles, California.

Boyd served on the Advisory Board of White Crane Institute, and was a frequent contributor to the homosexual wisdom and culture magazine White Crane.

Boyd was the author of over 30 books, including a bestselling collection of prayers, Are You Running with Me, Jesus? (1965). Are You Running With Me, Jesus was a great success, and gained Boyd a reasonable amount of public attention and fame, which continued throughout his life. It was re-issued in a 40th-anniversary edition. Until his death he wrote a column for The Huffington Post. He served as a poet/writer in residence for the Diocese of Los Angeles. Boyd died of complications from pneumonia at the age of 91 in Los Angeles on February 27, 2015.

Books
Crisis in Communication (Doubleday, 1957)
Christ and Celebrity Gods (Seabury, 1958)
Focus: Rethinking the Meaning of Our Evangelism (Morehouse-Barlow, 1960)
If I Go Down to Hell (Morehouse-Barlow, 1962)
The Hunger, the Thirst (Morehouse-Barlow, 1964)
Are You Running with Me, Jesus? (Holt, Rinehart & Winston, 1965/40th anniversary edition, 2005), became a bestseller
Free to Live, Free to Die (Holt, Rinehart & Winston, 1967)
Malcolm Boyd's Book of Days (Random House, 1968)
The Fantasy Worlds of Peter Stone and Other Fables (Harper & Row, 1969)
As I Live and Breathe (Random House, 1969)
My Fellow Americans (Holt, Rinehart & Winston, 1970)
Human Like Me, Jesus (Simon and Schuster, 1971)
The Lover (Word Books, 1972)
The Runner (Word Books, 1974)
The Alleluia Affair (Word Books, 1975)
Christian: Its Meanings in an Age of Future Shock (Hawthorn, 1975)
Am I Running with You, God? (Doubleday, 1977)
Take Off the Masks (Doubleday, 1978; rev. ed. HarperCollins 1993, White Crane Books 2008)
Look Back in Joy (Gay Sunshine Press, 1981; rev. ed. Alyson, 1990)
Half Laughing, Half Crying (St. Martin's Press, 1986)
Gay Priest: An Inner Journey (St. Martin's Press, 1986)
Edges, Boundaries and Connections (Broken Moon Press, 1992)
Rich with Years: Daily Meditations on Growing Older (HarperCollins, 1994)
Go Gentle Into That Good Night (Genesis Press, 1998)
Simple Grace: A Mentor's Guide to Growing Older (Westminster John Knox, 2001)
Prayers for the Later Years (Augsburg, 2002)
A Prophet in His Own Land: The Malcolm Boyd Reader (edited by Bo Young/Dan Vera) (White Crane Books, 2008)

Edited by Malcolm Boyd
On the Battle Lines: A Manifesto for Our Times (Morehouse-Barlow, 1964)
The Underground Church (Sheed & Ward, 1968)
When in the Course of Human Events (with Paul Conrad, Sheed & Ward, 1973)
Amazing Grace: Stories of Lesbian and Gay Faith (with Nancy L. Wilson, Crossing Press, 1991)
Race & Prayer: Collected Voices, Many Dreams (w/Chester Talton, Morehouse, 2003)
In Times Like These…How We Pray (with J. Jon Bruno, Seabury, 2005)

References

External links
 ; includes a decade-by-decade autobiography.
 , by Mark Thompson, 19 March 1997.
 
  (of which Boyd was rector).
 Interview with Malcolm Boyd The Lavender Effect Oral History Project
 FBI Docs Malcolm Boyd FBI File
Interview with Malcolm Boyd by Stephen McKiernan, Binghamton University Libraries Center for the Study of the 1960s

1923 births
2015 deaths
American Episcopal priests
American religious leaders
American gay writers
LGBT Anglican clergy
Writers from Buffalo, New York
Lambda Literary Award winners
Writers from the San Francisco Bay Area
Writers from Los Angeles
20th-century American writers
21st-century American writers
Deaths from pneumonia in California
Freedom Riders
Activists from Buffalo, New York
Activists from California
People from Silver Lake, Los Angeles
Film producers from California
LGBT people from New York (state)
20th-century American male writers
Film producers from New York (state)
20th-century American Episcopalians